Albert is a city in Barton County, Kansas, United States.  As of the 2020 census, the population of the city was 132.

History
Albert was founded in about the early 1880s. It was named for Albert Kriesinger, a storekeeper. Albert was a station on the Great Bend and Scott division of the Atchison, Topeka and Santa Fe Railway.

Geography
Albert is located at  (38.453153, -99.012461).

Demographics

2010 census
As of the census of 2010, there were 175 people, 77 households, and 58 families living in the city. The racial makeup of the city was 96.6% White, 0.6% Native American, 1.7% from other races, and 1.1% from two or more races. Hispanic or Latino of any race were 4.6% of the population.

There were 77 households, of which 24.7% had children under the age of 18 living with them, 59.7% were married couples living together, 14.3% had a female householder with no husband present, 1.3% had a male householder with no wife present, and 24.7% were non-families. 20.8% of all households were made up of individuals, and 10.4% had someone living alone who was 65 years of age or older. The average household size was 2.27 and the average family size was 2.62.

The median age in the city was 46.8 years. 21.1% of residents were under the age of 18; 6.3% were between the ages of 18 and 24; 18.9% were from 25 to 44; 34.2% were from 45 to 64; and 19.4% were 65 years of age or older. The gender makeup of the city was 46.3% male and 53.7% female.

2000 census
As of the census of 2000, there were 181 people, 76 households, and 54 families living in the city. The racial makeup of the city was 98.34% White, 0.55% from other races, and 1.10% from two or more races. Hispanic or Latino of any race were 2.21% of the population.

There were 76 households, out of which 27.6% had children under the age of 18 living with them, 63.2% were married couples living together, 5.3% had a female householder with no husband present, and 28.9% were non-families. 28.9% of all households were made up of individuals, and 15.8% had someone living alone who was 65 years of age or older. The average household size was 2.38 and the average family size was 2.91.

In the city, the population was spread out, with 26.5% under the age of 18, 5.0% from 18 to 24, 19.3% from 25 to 44, 30.4% from 45 to 64, and 18.8% who were 65 years of age or older. The median age was 44 years. For every 100 females, there were 94.6 males. For every 100 females age 18 and over, there were 90.0 males.

The median income for a household in the city was $39,375, and the median income for a family was $44,792. Males had a median income of $30,250 versus $22,083 for females. The per capita income for the city was $15,948. About 6.8% of families and 4.1% of the population were below the poverty line, including 3.8% of those under the age of eighteen and none of those 65 or over.

References

Further reading

External links
 Albert - Directory of Public Officials
 USD 403, local school district
 Albert city map, KDOT

Cities in Kansas
Cities in Barton County, Kansas
1880s establishments in Kansas